PCJ may refer to:

 Gorum language of India (ISO 639-3 code: pcj)
 PCJJ, Netherlands-based radio station, broadcast 1927 to 1947       
 Petroleum Corporation of Jamaica
 Puran Chand Joshi (1907–1980), early communist leader in India